Walter Alejandro Báez Bordón (born 29 November 1978 in Montevideo) is a Uruguayan footballer who plays as a defender for Club Atlético Villa Teresa.

Honours
Danubio
Uruguayan Primera División: 2004

External links
 Player profile 

1978 births
Living people
Footballers from Montevideo
Uruguayan footballers
Association football defenders
Danubio F.C. players
C.A. Bella Vista players
C.S.D. Municipal players
Cerro Largo F.C. players
Tacuarembó F.C. players
Plaza Colonia players
Villa Teresa players
Expatriate footballers in Guatemala